Mukim Sungai Kebun is a mukim in Brunei-Muara District, Brunei. It is part of Kampong Ayer, the traditional stilt settlements on the Brunei River in the capital Bandar Seri Begawan. The population was 4,750 in 2016.

Geography 
The mukim borders Mukim Peramu and Mukim Saba to the north, Mukim Kota Batu to the east, Mukim Lumapas to the south and west and Mukim Burong Pingai Ayer to the west and north.

Demographics 
As of 2016 census, the population was 4,750 with  males and  females. The mukim had 670 households occupying 656 dwellings. The entire population lived in urban areas.

Villages 
As of 2016, the mukim comprised the following census villages:

Facilities

Education 
The mukim is home to Awang Semaun Secondary School, the only secondary school for the residents of Kampong Ayer.

The government primary schools in the mukim include:
 Pehin Dato Jamil Primary School, Kampong Setia
 Pengiran Anak Puteri Besar Primary School, Sungai Kebun — established from the merger of Sungai Kebun Primary School and Dato Ahmad Primary School
 Sungai Siamas Primary School

Notes

References 

Sungai Kebun
Brunei-Muara District